Jaime Recio (born 15 January 1954) is a Filipino sports shooter. He competed in the mixed trap event at the 1992 Summer Olympics.

References

External links
 

1954 births
Living people
Filipino male sport shooters
Olympic shooters of the Philippines
Shooters at the 1992 Summer Olympics
Place of birth missing (living people)
Asian Games bronze medalists for the Philippines
Asian Games medalists in shooting
Shooters at the 1982 Asian Games
Shooters at the 2002 Asian Games
Shooters at the 2006 Asian Games
Medalists at the 2002 Asian Games
20th-century Filipino people
21st-century Filipino people